Bathylasma alearum is a species of barnacles in the Pachylasmatidae family. The species is androdioecious.

References 

Barnacles